The sacred groves is a zone of Biodiversity Park, Visakhapatnam located in the premises of Rani Chandramani Devi Government Hospital. It has more than 100 sacred plant species, which are medicinal herbs with religious importance. Many sacred plants are becoming rare and endangered. Hence they are to be reared, protected, and conserved. The zone was inaugurated on February 5, 2017, by Kambhampati Hari Babu, a member of parliament from Visakhapatnam, Andhra Pradesh.

Sacred plant species of the park in general 

More than 300 tree species mentioned in holy books (Bhagvad Gita, Ramayana, Mahabharata, Bible, Quran, Tripitaka, Zend-Avesta, Guru Granth Sahib) related to different religions (Hinduism, Christianity, Islam, Jainism, Buddhism,
and Sikhism) are reared in different zones of the Biodiversity Park. Many tree species are commonly seen in more than one religion.  For example, fig (Ficus carica) is almost common to all religions. Date palm (Phoenix dactylifera), olive (Olea europaea), pomegranate (Punica granatum), cypress (Cupressus sempervirens) are common to Christians and Muslims. Neem (Azadirachta indica), sacred fig or peepal or bodhi (Ficus religiosa), sal (Shorea robusta), sandal wood (Santalum album), bilva (Aegle marmelos) are common to Hindus, Buddhists and Jains. Banyan (Ficus bengalensis) and sacred fig (Ficus religiosa) are common to Hinduism, Buddhism, Jainsism, Judaism and Christianity. The maidenhair tree (Ginkgo biloba) is viewed as a sacred tree in all religions of China, Korea and Japan.

Some of the notable sacred plant species of the park are: maidenhair tree (Ginkgo biloba), Christmas tree (Araucaria excelsa), peepal/sacred fig/aswaddha (Ficus religiosa), banyan/marri/vata (Ficus benghalensis), ashoka tree (Saraca asoca), date palm (Phoenix dactylifera), Indian cedar / devadar (Cedrus deodara), cypress (Cupressus sempervirens), olive (Olea europaea), neem (Azadirachta indica), mango (Mangifera indica), kadamba (Anthocephalus cadamba), sandal wood (Santalum album), sami or jammi (Prosopis cineraria), bel, bilva or maredu (Aegle marmelos), moduga/flame of the forest (Butea monosperma), holy cross / calabash tree (Crescentia cujete), Indian lotus or padmam (Nelumbo nucifera), basilicum / tulasi (Ocimum sanctum), and rudraksha (Elaeocarpus ganitrus).

Sacred plant categories of the Sacred Grove Zone 
 

The Sacred Groves Zone of the Biodiversity Park contains more than 100 plants under five categories namely Ganesha vana, Nakshatra vana, Raasi vana, Saptarishi vana and Navagraha vana. The pictures are shown in the gallery. Some plants or trees are common to more than one vana or garden. For example, raavi / peepal / sacred fig (Ficus religiosa) is common to Ganesha vana, Raasi vana, Saptarishi vana and Nakshtra vana. Similarly sandra / chandra / kachu  (Acacia catechu)  is common to Nakshatra vana, Navagraha vana and Raasi vana.  Samee / jemmi (Prosopis cineraria) / (Prosopis spicigera)  is common to Ganesha vana, Nakshatra vana, Navagraha vana and Raasi vana.  Bilva / maredu / bael (Aegle marmelos) is common to Ganesha vana, Nakshatra vana and Saptarishi vana.

Ganesha vana – Ganesha garden with 21 plants 

This consists of 21 leaves (Aeakavimshathi patraha) of 21 plant species connected with the worship of Lord Ganesha.

This might also be the same as the Siddhivinayak Mandala Vaatika, where the garden is designed as per sacred geometry dedicated to SiddhiVinayak, another name for Lord Ganesha. 

A Mandala Vaatika, simply put, is a garden that is structured like a Mandala (i.e in a circular geometric designs). However, in Vedic times, these gardens were created as per very specific mathematical calculations, patterns and measurements. Each deity and planet has their own unique Mandala geometry. These gardens were treated as sacred groves where one could meditate and experience the vibrations of these deities. 

So, in ancient India one could meditate in a Rudra Mandala Vaatika, a Durga Mandala Vaatika, a Murugan Mandala Vaatika, a Varamahalakshmi Mandala Vaatika or even a Saptarishi Mandala Vaatika dedicated to the 7 most revered sages.

Nakshatra vana - garden with plants for 27 stars 
 
The nakshatra vana comprises plant species connected with the 27 stars or star constellations of Indian astrology.

Raasi vana - garden with plants for 12 zodiac signs 
This comprises plant species connected with the 12 signs in the zodiac system.

Saptarishi vana - garden of plants for seven great Indian sages 

This comprises plant species connected with seven great Indian sages or rishis.

Navagraha vana - garden with plants for nine planets 

This comprises nine plant species connected with nine planets or celestial bodies.

Gallery 
Some notable sacred plant species:

See also 
Biodiversity Park, Visakhapatnam
Dolphin Nature Conservation Society

References 

Sacred groves
Botanical gardens in India
Medicinal plants
Biodiversity Heritage Sites of India
2017 establishments in Andhra Pradesh